Gondipora is a village in tehsil Beerwah of district Budgam of the Jammu and Kashmir.

Educational Institutions 

 Govt. HS School Gondipora.

 Govt. MS School Gondipora.

 Salfia Secondary Institute Gondipora.

See Also 

 Rathsoon.
 Aripanthan.
 Beerwah, Jammu and Kashmir.
 Ohangam.
 Sonapah.
 Wanihama.
 Meerpora.
 Kandour.
 Arizal, Jammu and Kashmir.

References

External links 

Villages in Budgam district